This list of tallest buildings in Texas ranks skyscrapers in the U.S. state of Texas by height. As of May 2011, there are 1,217 completed high-rises in the state.

Texas's history of skyscrapers began with the completion in 1909 of the 14-story Praetorian Building in Dallas, which is considered to be the state's first high-rise.  The building rose 190 feet (58 m) above ground.

Buildings in Texas taller than  
This list ranks Texas skyscrapers that stand at least 600 feet (183 m) tall, based on standard height measurement. This includes spires and architectural details but does not include antenna masts or other objects not part of the original plans (with the exception of the broadcast array that was added to the top of Renaissance Tower twelve years after its initial completion). Existing structures are included for ranking purposes based on present height.

See also 
List of tallest buildings in Houston
List of tallest buildings in Dallas
List of tallest buildings in Austin
List of tallest buildings in San Antonio
List of tallest buildings in Fort Worth
List of tallest buildings in El Paso
Architecture of Texas

References 

Houston  Buildings of the City Emporis Buildings.
Dallas  Buildings of the City Emporis Buildings.

 
Lists of buildings and structures in Texas
Texas